The Zhaga Consortium is an international organization, founded in February 2010,  establishing industry specifications of interfaces for components used in LED luminaires. As of February 2021 it has more than 300 members. The consortium is a member program of the IEEE Industry Standards and Technology Organization  (IEEE-ISTO.)  Zhaga’s specifications, which are called Books, address electrical, mechanical, optical, thermal and communication interfaces and allow the interoperability of components. Results of Zhaga specifications are that components are interoperable and can be replaced or serviced and that a LED luminaire can be upgraded after installation when new technology is available.

The Zhaga consortium has established a logo program to indicate compatibility with these standards through a program of certification and testing. Only certified products are allowed to carry the Zhaga logo.

References

Standards organizations in the United States
Light-emitting diodes
Organizations established in 2010
2010 establishments in the United States